Taylor Fashions Ltd and Old & Campbell Ltd v Liverpool Victoria Trustees Co Ltd  [1979] is a leading case in English land law on proprietary estoppel. Due to a common mistake and no element of enticement to believe that mistake, estoppel was not available on the facts.

Facts
The claimants were two companies, Taylor Fashions Ltd and Old & Campbell Ltd, who held leases on two business premises on Westover Road, Bournemouth. Both companies asked to have their leases renewed by their landlord, the Liverpool Victoria Trustees Co Ltd. All parties had assumed that the two leases were accompanied by a statutory right of renew when they came to an end. Based on this assumption, both of the claimant companies had spent money improving their premises. However, it transpired that Liverpool Victoria was under no legal obligation to renew. The claimants argued that Liverpool Victoria should be estopped from not renewing, based on their reliance. In response, Liverpool Victoria argued that estoppel was not relevant because they had not acted unconscionably but simply by mistake.

Judgment
Oliver J noted that Mr Scott and Mr Essayan for the claimants said: one’s state of mind was irrelevant. Mr Millett for Liverpool Victoria argued that unconscionability was necessary, following Fry J in the earlier leading case of Willmott v Barber. The judge noted:

Oliver J clarified that Willmott was only a case applicable to situations where someone had stood by without protest as his rights were infringed. Knowledge of one of the parties alleged to be estopped is just one of many relevant factors. One should consider all the circumstances. On the facts of the case, the claim by Taylor Fashions failed, with 'regret', because they had not been encouraged in their belief by Liverpool Victoria. Old & Campbell, however, did succeed because they had been encouraged to spend a very large sum in the belief that they could renew.

Significance
The case underlines the importance of businesses renting leased premises to be well-advised before entering into their leases, and in particular to be aware of the pitfall of doing authorised works without business security of tenure.

It also underlines the importance of clear communication with the landlord as a clear written promise from the landlord that the business tenants could renew their premises leases, having looked at the leases, would have enabled the business tenants to benefit somewhat from the works they had carried out.

See also

Estoppel

Notes

References
N Gravells (ed), Landmark Cases in Land Law (2013)

English contract case law
English land case law
High Court of Justice cases
1982 in case law
1982 in British law